Admiral The Honourable Henry John Rous (23 January 1795 – 19 June 1877) was an officer of the British Royal Navy, who served during the Napoleonic Wars, and was later a Member of Parliament and a leading figure in horse racing.

Biography

Family background and education
Rous was the second son of John Rous, 1st Earl of Stradbroke, and was educated at Westminster School, and Dr. Burney's Academy. His elder brother was John Rous, 2nd Earl of Stradbroke, and his half-sister married Vice-Admiral Sir Henry Hotham.

Naval career
In February 1809 he moved into the 74-gun , Captain the Hon. Arthur Kaye Legge. After taking part in the Walcheren Campaign, in November 1809 he became a midshipman aboard , flagship of Sir James Saumarez in the Baltic. In March 1811 he joined the ship , Captain John Gore, employed off Lisbon and in the Channel; and from December 1811 he served in the frigate , Captain William Hoste, taking part in the Adriatic campaign.

There Rous took part in numerous actions; on the night of 31 August 1812 he took part in the cutting out from the port of Lema, near Venice, of seven vessels loaded with ship timbers for the Venetian government, together with French xebec Tisiphone and two gunboats, and on 6 January 1813 the boats of Bacchante and the sloop  successfully captured five enemy gun-vessels in the neighbourhood of Otranto. On 15 May 1813 he assisted at the capture and destruction of the castle and batteries of Karlobag, and on 12 June he commanded the Bacchantes yawl in the capture of seven large gun-boats, three smaller gun-vessels, and 14 merchantmen at Giulianova. The British boats approached and boarded under a heavy fire of grape and musketry, while the Marines landed on shore, driving off 100 enemy troops and capturing two field guns. Rous was put in command of one of the merchantmen, laden with oil, which broached and capsized in heavy weather around midnight, and was only kept afloat by the buoyancy of her cargo. Rous and his prize crew were eventually rescued by another prize around 4 a.m. Into 1814 Rous participated in the capture of Rovigno, the island of Lesina, and the fortresses of Cattaro and Ragusa.

On 18 May 1814 he was promoted to lieutenant and from August 1814 until December 1815 served aboard the frigate , Captain John Bastard, off Lisbon and in the Mediterranean. From January 1817 he served aboard , the flagship of Rear-Admiral Robert Plampin at Saint Helena, and on 2 August was appointed acting-commander of the 14-gun sloop . He then commanded the brig-sloop  at Cork from November 1821, and the sixth-rate  in the Mediterranean from February 1822.

Rous was promoted to post-captain on 25 April 1823, and from July 1825 commanded  in the East Indies. He visited Australia, and in April 1827, organised Sydney's first regatta. In August 1828, he explored the Tweed, and he discovered, named and explored the Richmond River, both in northeastern New South Wales. The area between these rivers is known as Rous County, but counties in Australia are not widely known and are mainly used for cadastral purposes. While in Moreton Bay he named the Rous Channel, Dunwich, and Stradbroke Island, after his family titles and influenced the naming of Ipswich, Queensland.

Rous returned to England in August 1829, and from November 1834 commanded the frigate . His ship ran ashore on the coast of Labrador in the Strait of Belle Isle in September 1835 and was greatly damaged. Rous, however, brought her across the Atlantic Ocean with a sprung foremast and without keel, forefoot or rudder, and though the ship was making  of water an hour.

Thoroughbred horse racing

His father owned a stud farm in Suffolk and won the 1815 2,000 Guineas with the colt Tigris. Rous, always fond of the sport became a steward of the Jockey Club in 1838, a position he held almost uninterruptedly to his death. In 1855, he was appointed public handicapper. In that role he introduced the weight-for-age scale. He managed the stables of the Duke of Bedford at Newmarket for many years, and wrote a work on On the Laws and Practice of Horse Racing that procured for him the title of the Blackstone of the Turf.

The Rous Memorial Stakes was named in his honour.

Political career
In the general election of July 1841, he was elected as Conservative Member of Parliament (MP) for Westminster, and in February 1846 Sir Robert Peel appointed him Fourth Naval Lord, in which post he served only until July. However, this appointment triggered a by-election, which Rous lost to the Liberal candidate, De Lacy Evans, whom he had defeated in 1841.

Though no longer an active serving officer Rous' seniority saw him promoted to rear admiral on 17 December 1852, to vice admiral on 5 January 1858, and to admiral on the Retired List on 6 June 1863.

Admiral Rous died at No. 13 Berkeley Square in London on 19 June 1877. He is buried at Kensal Green Cemetery, London.

See also
 Henham Park

References
Notes

Bibliography

External links

1795 births
1877 deaths
Younger sons of earls
People from Mid Suffolk District
People educated at Westminster School, London
Royal Navy admirals
Royal Navy personnel of the Napoleonic Wars
Conservative Party (UK) MPs for English constituencies
Lords of the Admiralty
UK MPs 1841–1847
British racehorse owners and breeders
Burials at Kensal Green Cemetery
Horse racing administrators
Explorers of Australia
People educated at Burney's Academy